Arasvika or Arasvik is a village and ferry point in the municipality of Aure in Møre og Romsdal county, Norway.

Name
The oldest recorded form of the village's name is Oraldsuik, which appeared in a document from 1342.

Geography
Arasvika lies on the south side of the island of Ertvågsøy along Arasvik Fjord. There are road connections to Arasvika via County Road 682 from the north and County Road 362 from the east. The ferry connects the village to Hennset in the municipality of Halsa and European route E39.

Notable people
Notable people that were born or lived in Arasvika include:
 Holger Aresvik (1883–1938), fiddler and painter
 Oddvar Aresvik (1915–1996), professor of agricultural economics at the Norwegian College of Agriculture at Ås

References

External links
Arasvika at Norgeskart
Arasvika-Hennset ferry schedule

Aure, Norway
Villages in Møre og Romsdal